Rajauli Assembly constituency is an assembly constituency for Bihar Legislative Assembly in Nawada district of Bihar, India. It comes under Nawada (Lok Sabha constituency). Prakash Veer of RJD had won the 2020 Bihar Legislative Assembly election from Rajauli.

Members of Legislative Assembly

Election results

2020 

In the 2015 Bihar Legislative Assembly election in Rajauli, RJD won with 45.81% votes while BJP came in second with 42.81% votes, with a vote margin of 4615 votes.

References

External links
 

Assembly constituencies of Bihar